Jaggery is a traditional non-centrifugal cane sugar consumed in the Indian Subcontinent, Southeast Asia, and Africa. It is a concentrated product of cane juice and often date or palm sap without separation of the molasses and crystals, and can vary from golden brown to dark brown in colour. It contains up to 50% sucrose, up to 20% invert sugars, and up to 20% moisture, with the remainder made up of other insoluble matter, such as wood ash, proteins, and bagasse fibres. Jaggery is very similar to muscovado, an important sweetener in Portuguese, British and French cuisine. The Kenyan Sukari ngutu/nguru has no fibre; it is dark and is made from sugar cane and also sometimes extracted from palm tree.

Etymology
It is a doublet of sugar.

Origins and production

Jaggery is made of the products of sugarcane and the toddy palm tree. The sugar made from the sap of the date palm is more prized and less commonly available outside of the regions where it is made. The toddy palm is tapped for producing jaggery in India, Bangladesh, Pakistan, Nepal, Myanmar and Sri Lanka. 

In Sri Lanka, syrup extracts from kithul (Caryota urens) trees are widely used for jaggery production.

Traditionally, the syrup is made by boiling raw sugarcane juice or palm sap in large, shallow, round-bottomed vessels.

Preparation

Historically, the sugarcane cultivators used crushers that were powered by oxen, but all modern crushers are power-driven. These crushers are placed in fields near the sugarcane plants. The cut and cleaned sugarcane is crushed and the extracted cane juice is collected in a large vessel. A quantity of the juice is transferred to a smaller vessel for heating on a furnace.

The vessel is heated for about an hour. Dried wood pulp from the crushed sugarcane is traditionally used as fuel for the furnace. While boiling the juice, lime is added to it so that all the wood particles rise to the top of the juice in a froth, which is skimmed off. Finally, the juice is thickened. The resulting thick liquid is about one-third of the original volume.

This hot liquid is golden. It is stirred continuously and lifted with a spatula to observe whether it forms a thread or drips while falling. If it forms many threads, it has completely thickened. It is poured into a shallow flat-bottomed pan to cool and solidify. The pan is extremely large to allow only a thin coat of this hot liquid to form at its bottom, so as to increase the surface area for quick evaporation and cooling. After cooling, the jaggery becomes a soft solid that is molded into the desired shape.

The quality of jaggery is judged by its colour; dark brown means it is not clarified during making, or the sugarcane juice is boiled in its wholesome state with full nutrients intact. Some people misinterpret such wholesomeness as impure and clarify the juice to improve color while taking out the nutrients to make golden-yellow jaggery, which is nothing but refined sugar. Due to this grading scale, coloured adulterants are sometimes added to jaggery to simulate the golden hue; which are highly toxic for our body.

So, natural dark brown jaggery is a simply a product derived from wholesome sugarcane juice, by means of boiling at nearly 200℃ in a large cast iron pan, and food grade mustard or castor oil (having high smoke point) is usually used in such pans in negligible quantity (say 2 teaspoon in 100kgs) such that the very hot juice froth does not come out of pan during boiling.
Mustard or Castor oil is present in perfect wholesome jaggery's in traces, and qualities of such oils (laxative) coincides & supports the similar qualities of wholesome jaggery.

Many manufacturer use synthetic oil, and argue that since it is in traces so no issue on health. However, synthetic oil even in traces causes toxic reactions inside our body. 
So, one not only needs to verify the wholesomeness of jaggery (attained with no clarification), but also verify the type of oil used, even in traces.

During winters wholesome jaggery along with traces of mustard or castor oil added, serves as a dense nutritious food of hot potency .

Uses

South Asia (Indian subcontinent) 
Jaggery is used as an ingredient in sweet and savoury dishes in the cuisines of India, Pakistan, Bangladesh, Nepal, Sri Lanka, Afghanistan, Iran. For example, a pinch of it is sometimes added to sambar, rasam and other staples in Udupi cuisine. Jaggery is added to lentil soups (dāl) to add sweetness to balance the spicy, salty, and sour components, particularly in Gujarati cuisine.

In Sri Lanka, jaggery is usually made using the syrup of the kithul palm tree, or from coconut syrup. The respective names in Sinhalese are kitul hakuru (කිතුල් හකුරු) and pol hakuru (පොල් හකුරු). Jaggery from the syrup of the Palmyrah palm is more prominent in the northern part of the country; this is referred to as palmyrah jaggery or thal hakuru (තල් හකුරු). Jaggery made from sugarcane syrup is considered inferior to these types of palm syrup-based jaggery varieties, and the term jaggery (හකුරු) is generally understood in the country to refer to palm syrup based jaggery rather than sugarcane jaggery.

Kolhapur is one of the largest producers of jaggery in India and has a GI Tag for Jaggery. Most vegetable dishes, curries, and dals, and many desserts contain it. Jaggery is especially used during Makar Sankranti for making a dessert called tilgul. In Gujarat, a similar preparation known called tal na ladu or tal sankli is made. In rural Maharashtra and Karnataka, water and a piece of jaggery are given to a person arriving home from working under a hot sun. In Indian culture during the New Year feast, jaggery-based sweets are made. In Andhra, Telangana and Karnataka on Ugadi festival day (New Year), Ugadi Pachadi is made from jaggery and five other ingredients (shad ruchulu- sweet, sour, salt, tangy, spice and bitter) and is consumed symbolizing life is a mixture of happiness, disgust, fear, surprise, anger and sadness. Also, it is consider auspicious to see jaggery in dreams in hinduism. 

Molasses (काकवी), a byproduct of the production of jaggery, is used in rural Maharashtra and Karnataka as a sweetener. It contains many minerals not found in ordinary sugar and is considered beneficial to health in traditional Ayurvedic medicine. It is an ingredient of many sweet delicacies, such as gur ke chawal / chol ("jaggery rice"), a traditional Rajasthani or Punjabi dish.

In Gujarat, laddus are made from wheat flour and jaggery. A well-known Maharashtrian recipe, puran poli, uses it as a sweetener apart from sugar. Jaggery is considered an easily available sweet which is shared on any good occasion. In engagement ceremonies, small particles of it are mixed with coriander seeds (ધાણા). Hence, in many Gujarati communities, engagement is commonly known by the metonym gol-dhana (ગોળ-ધાણા), literally "jaggery and coriander seeds".

Jaggery is used extensively in South India to balance the pungency of spicy foods. In Andhra Pradesh, and Tamil Nadu it is used for sweets such as chakkara pongal and milk pongal (prepared with rice, milk, jaggery). During Sankranti, Ariselu, an authentic Andhra Pradesh dish, is prepared, and in Tamil Nadu, ellurundai (sesame balls), Adhirasam and pori vilangu urundai (puffed rice balls) are prepared as offering - called prasadam - to god during puja and festivals such as Diwali, Tamil New Year and Janmashtami. 

A sweet liquid called "Paanakam", made of water, jaggery and peppercorns is prepared as the favorite offering to Lord Rama during Rama Navami festival. In Kerala, it is considered auspicious and is widely used in cooking. It is a vital ingredient in many varieties of payasam, a sweet dish.

In Tamil Nadu, jaggery is used exclusively as a sweetener. It is used in a dish called chakkarai pongal. It is prepared during the festival of Pongal (Thai Pongal), which is held when the harvesting season begins. It is used to make kalhi, to sweeten fruit salads and payasam (sweet milk) that are offered to the gods. Jaggery is used in religious rituals. In rural areas, cane jaggery and palm jaggery are used to sweeten beverages, whereas refined sugar has replaced it in urban areas.

In Odia cuisine, cakes or piṭhas contain jaggery. Pithas like Arisa pitha are made out of jaggery called as guda in Odia. Kakara pitha contains coconut filings which are caramelized using jaggery. Guda is also added to rice flakes known as chuda and eaten for breakfast. Some marmalade made of mango and dillenia contain the ingredient.

In Bengali cuisine, it is commonly used in making sweet dishes, some of which mix jaggery with milk and coconut. Popular sweet dishes such as laḍḍu/laṛu or paṭishapta piṭha mix it with coconut shreds. Jaggery is molded into novel shapes as a type of candy. The same preparation of sweets have been made in its neighbouring state of Assam. Some of the popular sweet dishes of Assam such as til-pitha (made of rice powder, sesame and jaggery), other rice-based pitha, and payas are made of jaggery. In some villages of Assam, people drink salty red tea with a cube of gurd (jaggery), which is popularly called cheleka-chah (licking tea).

Traditional Karnataka sweets, such as paayasa, obbattu (holige) and unday use different kinds of jaggery. A pinch is commonly added to sambar (a.k.a. huLi saaru) and rasam (a.k.a. saaru). Karnataka produces sugar and palm-based jaggery.

Muzaffarnagar in Uttar Pradesh has the largest jaggery market in the world, followed by Anakapalle in the Visakhapatnam District in Andhra Pradesh. The Kolhapur District in western Maharashtra is famous for its jaggery, which is yellow and much sought-after in Maharashtra and Gujarat. Mandya in Karnataka is known for its jaggery production.

Southeast Asia 

In Myanmar, jaggery, called htanyet in Burmese, is harvested from toddy palm syrup. In central Myanmar and around Bagan (Pagan), toddy syrup is collected solely for making jaggery. The translucent white syrup is boiled until it becomes golden brown and then made into bite-size pieces. It is considered a sweet and is eaten by children and adults alike, usually in the afternoon with a pot of green tea. It has been referred to locally as Burmese chocolate. Toddy palm jaggery is sometimes mixed with coconut shreds, jujube puree or sesame, depending on the area. This type of jaggery is used in Burmese cooking, usually to add colour and enrich the food.

Other uses 
Other uses include jaggery toffees and jaggery cake made with pumpkin preserve, cashew nuts, peanuts and spices. Jaggery may be used in the creation of alcoholic beverages such as palm wine.

Besides being a food, jaggery may be used (mixed in an emulsion with buttermilk and mustard oil) to season the inside of tandoor ovens.

Jaggery is used in natural dying of fabric. It is also used in hookahs in rural areas of Pakistan and India.

Jaggery can be used as a tissue fixative in anatomic pathology.

Nomenclature

In the Indian Subcontinent
 From guḍa in Sanskrit:
 guṛ Bengali, Bhojpuri, Punjabi, Haryanvi, Hindi
 gur in Assamese and Nagamese
 ɠuṛ in Sindhi and Urdu
 guṛô in Odia
 goḍ (Romanized godd) in Konkani
 guḷ in Marathi
 gôḷ in Gujarati and Rajasthani
 gwëṛa in Pashto

 From Proto-Dravidian *bel-am:
 vellam in Tamil and Malayalam, or longer form panai vellam in Tamil
 bellam in Telugu
 bella in Kannada and Tulu
 From Sanskrit śarkarā:
 śarkkara or cakkara in Malayalam ( or )
 sakkarai in Tamil
 sakkhar in Nepali
 hakuru in Sinhala and Dhivehi
 From Sanskrit miṣṭa:
 mitha in Bhojpuri
 mithoi in Assamese
 Other terms:
 kawltu tuikang in Paite
 kurtai in Mizo
 bheli in Nepali
 karuppaṭṭi, karippaṭṭi, or karipeṭṭi in Malayalam is jaggery made from palm juice, and panam kalkaṇḍam is rock candy made from palm juice.
 karupaṭṭi or panam kalkaṇḍu in Tamil

In Southeast Asia

Cambodia 

 Skor tnaot in Khmer

Myanmar (Burma) 

 Htanyet [Toddy Palm Jaggery] in Burmese
 Kyan Tha Kar [Sugarcane Jaggery] in Burmese

Malaysia
 Gula melaka or Gula merah in Malay
 Gula nisan/nise in Kelantanese Malay
 Gula apong in Sarawak, Malaysia is a variant of the jaggery, which is made from the sap of the nipah palm or Nypa fruticans.

Indonesia
 Gula jawa in Indonesian and Javanese
 Gula merah in Indonesian and Malay
 Gula aren in Indonesian and Betawi
 Gula kawung in Sundanese

Philippines

 Tagapulot or Koya-Koya (Ilocano)
 Pakombuk (Kapampangan)
 Panocha (Philippine Spanish)
 Panutsa (Tagalog)
 Sangkaka (Tagalog)
 Bagkat Bao - may be regional to Bulacan (Tagalog)
 Calamay - Leyte and Samar (Waray-waray)

Thailand
 Palm jaggery: , 
 Coconut jaggery: , 
 Cane sugar: , 
 Granulated brown cane sugar: , 

Vietnam
 Đường thốt nốt in Vietnamese

Elsewhere
 Raspadura in Cuba and Panama
 Rapadura in Brazil
 Panela in Central America and parts of South America
 Piloncillo in Mexico
 Tapa de dulce in Costa Rica
 Chancaca in Peru 
 Papelón, panela or miel de panela in Venezuela
 Sukari nguuru in Swahili
  in Japanese
 Gur in Afghanistan

Image gallery

See also

References

Articles containing video clips
Indian cuisine
Sri Lankan desserts and sweets
Southeast Asian cuisine
Sugar